Typhoon (also expanded as Typhoon "Mad Wave" Motion Theater Deluxe) is a coin-operated media-based motion simulator created by Triotech. It is a 3D arcade machine with 2 seats for people to sit in including 15 films where it can shake and drop. The machine delivers up to 2 g-forces of acceleration.

Films
Original releases:

Canyon Coaster
Super Jets
Road Fury/Grand Prix Raceway
Astro Pinball
Ravine Racer
Haunted Mine
Rats Race
Speed Coaster
Hover Chase
Snow Ride
The Night at the Toy Store
Safari Adventure
Road HoggersPirate RapidsAir FighterNwave Exclusive films:Dino SafariLost In FearSpeed RaceSteam SpeedThe Wild West Mine Ride'''

References

Virtual reality
Simulator rides
Arcade hardware